Pommes dauphine (sometimes referred to as dauphine potatoes) are crisp potato puffs made by mixing mashed potatoes with savoury choux pastry, forming the mixture into quenelle shapes or balls, and then deep-frying them at .

Pommes dauphine typically accompany red meats or chicken. They are normally found in restaurants, although in France they can also be bought in most supermarkets. The home variety can be oven cooked to avoid the use of oil, but this is not authentic.

Etymology
The dish is named after the Dauphine, the title given to the wife of the Dauphin, or heir to the French throne.

Comparison with similar side dishes
Similar potato sides that can be used instead of pommes dauphine include pommes noisette, pommes duchesse, croquettes and pommes soufflées. Pommes dauphines are unique, however, in that they are made with choux pastry, which makes them less dense. Pommes noisette have a similar round shape but are only made of potato and are significantly smaller.

See also
 List of choux pastry dishes

References

French cuisine
Potato dishes
Deep fried foods
Choux pastry